César José Urpín Díaz (born 14 August 1994) is a Venezuelan footballer who plays as a defender for Aragua F.C. in the Venezuelan Primera División.

References

External links

1994 births
Living people
Atlético Venezuela C.F. players
Caracas FC players
Aragua FC players
Venezuelan Primera División players
Venezuelan footballers
Association football defenders
People from Puerto la Cruz